Leo O'Brien may refer to:

 Leo O'Brien (actor) (1970–2012), American television and film actor
 Leo O'Brien (cricketer) (1907–1997), Australian cricketer
 Leo F. O'Brien (1924-1968), member of the Illinois House of Representatives
 Leo P. O'Brien (1893–1968), member of the Wisconsin State Senate
 Leo W. O'Brien (1900–1982), U.S. Representative from New York